Mario López Valdez (born January 18, 1957 in Cubiri de la Loma, Sinaloa), popularly known as Malova, is a Mexican businessman and politician, a member of the National Action Party. He was a senator of the state of Sinaloa from 2006 to 2010 and municipal president of Ahome Municipality from 2002 to 2004. He was the Governor of Sinaloa, from 2011 to 2016.

Background
Mario López Valdez is an accounting graduate of the Technological Institute of Los Mochis (ITLM). In 1984, he founded the MALOVA hardware store chain.

Political career
In 2002, López Valdez was elected municipal president of Ahome Municipality, whose capital is Los Mochis. In 2005 Governor Jesús Aguilar Padilla appointed him secretary of Planning and Development in the state government. He was elected in 2006 as the Institutional Revolutionary Party (PRI) candidate for the Mexican Senate, where he served on the Regional Development and the Environment, Natural Resources and Fisheries, and Agriculture and Water Resources commissions. On March 19, 2010, he resigned his membership of the PRI to run as candidate for governor of Sinaloa for the PAN. He was elected July 4, 2010, defeating PRI candidate Jesús Vizcarra Calderón, a wealthy businessman and Culiacán municipal president who had been linked to local drug traffickers, including Ismael "El Mayo" Zambada.  He is also buddies with El Chapo.

As governor, López Valdez has been accused of corruption and links to organized crime. In July 2014, he supported a bill that barred journalists from covering crime and public safety stories. However, López Valdez pledged to repeal the law just a few days after its unanimous passage in the state legislature, following a national outcry.

References

External links

 Official website

1957 births
Living people
Governors of Sinaloa
National Action Party (Mexico) politicians
Mexican businesspeople
Municipal presidents in Sinaloa
Politicians from Sinaloa
21st-century Mexican politicians